Garmay Sara (also Romanized as Garmāy Sarā; also known as ‘Alīābād and Garm Āb Sarā) is a village in Shabkhus Lat Rural District, Rankuh District, Amlash County, Gilan Province, Iran. At the 2006 census, its population was 332, in 82 families.

References 

Populated places in Amlash County